David Robert Hall (5 March 18746 September 1945) was a politician and lawyer in New South Wales, Australia.

Hall was born in Harrietville, Victoria, and studied law at the University of Sydney before becoming a barrister in 1903. By that time, he had already become involved in state politics, having been elected to the New South Wales Legislative Assembly as the member for the rural electorate of Gunnedah in 1901.

Hall made a switch to federal politics at the 1906 election, contesting the House of Representatives seat of Werriwa for the Labor Party. He was successful, defeating Alfred Conroy, the sitting Free Trade Party member. Hall represented the electorate until 1912, when he resigned mid-term to return to State politics. At the subsequent by-election, the new Labor candidate, Benjamin Bennett, once again defeated Conroy.

On 2 April 1912 New South Wales Premier James McGowen appointed Hall to the Legislative Council and as Minister of Justice. Two days later he was also appointed Solicitor General. Hall moved to the Legislative Assembly when he won the seat of Enmore in December 1913, holding it until 1920. He was Attorney General between 1914 and 1919. Hall was  Attorney General in the Holman Labor ministry from 1914 until November 1916 when Holman and his supporters, including Hall, were expelled from the Labor Party for supporting conscription. Holman continued as Premier with the support of the Liberal Reform Party, and Hall continued to be Attorney General, but was no longer Minister of Justice. In 1919 he became Minister for Housing and Vice-President of the Executive Council until February 1920.

Hall was appointed Agent-General for New South Wales in London in February 1920, but this appointment was cancelled in April by the incoming Storey Labor government.

Hall subsequently had a successful career as a solicitor and ran unsuccessfully for the United Australia Party in the Senate in 1937.

References

 

Members of the Australian House of Representatives for Werriwa
Members of the New South Wales Legislative Assembly
Australian Labor Party members of the Parliament of Australia
Nationalist Party of Australia members of the Parliament of New South Wales
1874 births
1945 deaths
Attorneys General of New South Wales
Solicitors General for New South Wales
Australian Labor Party members of the Parliament of New South Wales
20th-century Australian politicians
Agents-General for New South Wales